The Tróia International Film Festival, commonly referred to as Festroia was an annual international film festival in Portugal held from 1985 to 2014.

Held in the town of Setúbal and named after the nearby Tróia Peninsula where the festival was originally based until 1993, the festival showcased mainly arthouse films made by smaller or less publicised national cinemas from around the world. In later editions its competitive section was open to films from countries producing less than 30 feature films per year. Usually held in the first week of June, the festival gave out a series of prizes, with the main award for Best Film being the Golden Dolphin (Golfinho de Ouro).

The last edition held was the 30th festival held in 2014. Due to cuts in funding, the 2015 edition was cancelled in March that year, three months before it was scheduled to take place, and a notification saying that there would be no 31st edition was put up on the official website in its last update. The website itself was taken down in early 2017.

Golden Dolphin winners

Footnotes

External links
Festróia - Tróia International Film Festival overview at the Internet Movie Database

Recurring events established in 1985
Portuguese film awards
Film festivals in Portugal
1985 establishments in Portugal
Annual events in Portugal
2015 disestablishments in Portugal
Recurring events disestablished in 2015